Vikings is a historical drama television series created and written by Michael Hirst for the Canadian television channel History. The series broadly follows the exploits of the legendary Viking chieftain Ragnar Lothbrok and his crew, and in later seasons those of his sons. The first season premiered on March 3, 2013 in Canada and concluded on April 28, 2013, consisting of nine episodes.   It begins at the start of the Viking Age, marked by the Lindisfarne raid in 793, and follows Ragnar's quest to become Earl, and his desire to raid England.

Cast

Main
 Travis Fimmel as Ragnar Lothbrok, a Viking farmer and warrior who yearns to raid the rumoured riches of undiscovered England
 Katheryn Winnick as Lagertha, Ragnar's wife, and a shield-maiden
 Clive Standen as Rollo, Ragnar's brother
 Jessalyn Gilsig as Siggy, Earl Haraldson's wife
 Gustaf Skarsgård as Floki, a gifted shipbuilder and Ragnar's friend
 Gabriel Byrne as Earl Haraldson, Earl of the settlement known as Kattegat, the home of Ragnar
 George Blagden as Athelstan, an Anglo-Saxon monk captured by Ragnar on his first raid in England
 Donal Logue as King Horik of Denmark
 Alyssa Sutherland as Princess Aslaug, a love interest of Ragnar, claiming to be the daughter of the valkyrie Brynhildr

Recurring
 John Kavanagh as The Seer, the seiðmann of Kattegat
 David Pearse as Svein, the loyal henchman of Earl Haraldson
 Nathan O'Toole as Bjorn Ironside, Ragnar and Lagertha's son
 Ruby O'Leary as Gyda, Ragnar and Lagertha's daughter
 Eddie Elks as Olafur, a Viking warrior in the service of Earl Haraldson
 Vladimir Kulich as Erik, elderly Viking and one of Ragnar's warriors
 Diarmaid Murtagh as Leif, one of Ragnar's warriors and the son of Erik
 Tadhg Murphy as Arne, one of Ragnar's warriors; an archer with an eye-patch.
 Jefferson Hall as Torstein, one of Ragnar's warriors and closest friends
 Jouko Ahola as Kauko, a Finnish Viking and one of Ragnar's warriors
 Eric Higgins as Knut Tjodolf, Earl Haraldson's half-brother
 Will Irvine as Brother Cenwulf, serving at the monastery of Lindisfarne
 Carrie Crowley as Elisef, wife of Erik and mother of Leif
 Sam Lucas Smith as Edwin, a Saxon
 Ivan Kaye as King Aelle of Northumbria
 Jonathon Kemp as Lord Wigea, an advisor of King Aelle
 Peter Gaynor as Lord Edgar, an advisor of King Aelle
 Elinor Crawley as Thyri, Earl Haraldson and Siggy's daughter
 Maude Hirst as Helga, Floki's woman
 Trevor Cooper as Earl Bjarni, Thyri's husband-to-be
 Angus MacInnes as Tostig, an old Viking warrior

Guests
 Eddie Drew as Odin, appearing in Ragnar's visions
 Gerard McCarthy as Brondsted, a Viking who attacks Lagertha
 Billy Gibson as Ulf, Earl Haraldson's bodyguard
 David Wilmot as Olaf Andwend
 Conor Madden as Eric Trygvasson, a Viking who is prosecuted in Kattegat by Earl Haraldson
 Donna Dent as Rafarta, a woman of Kattegat
 Cian Quinn as Olaf, son of Ingolf
 Craig Whittaker as Hakon, a Viking and one of Ragnar's men
 Des Braiden as Father Cuthbert, in charge of the monastery of Lindisfarne
 Sebastiaan Vermeul Taback as Osiric
 David Murray as Lord Aethelwulf, the brother of King Aelle
 Cathy White as Queen Ealhswith of Northumbria, King Aelle's wife
 Sean Treacy as Prince Egbert, King Aelle's son
 James Flynn as Eadric, a Saxon lord
 Thorbjørn Harr as Jarl Borg, the Jarl of Götaland
 David Michael Scott as Nils, a Viking warrior from Götaland in the service of Jarl Borg

Episodes

Production

Development
An Irish-Canadian co-production presented by Metro-Goldwyn-Mayer, Vikings was developed and produced by Octagon Films and Take 5 Productions. Morgan O'Sullivan, Sheila Hockin, Sherry Marsh, Alan Gasmer, James Flynn, John Weber, and Michael Hirst are credited as executive producers. This season was produced by Steve Wakefield and Keith Thompson. Bill Goddard and Séamus McInerney are co-producers.

The production team for this season includes casting directors Frank and Nuala Moiselle, costume designer Joan Bergin, visual effects supervisors Julian Parry and Dominic Remane, stunt action designers Franklin Henson and Richard Ryan, composer Trevor Morris, production designer Tom Conroy, editors Aaron Marshall for the first, third, fifth, seventh and ninth episodes, and Michele Conroy for the second, fourth, sixth and eighth episodes, and cinematographer John Bartley. PJ Dillon served as second unit director of photography.

Music

The musical score for the first season was composed by Trevor Morris in collaboration with Steven Richard Davis, Steve Tavaglione, Brian Kilgore, Tina Guo and Mel Wesson. The opening sequence is accompanied by the song "If I Had a Heart" by Fever Ray.

The soundtrack album was released on June 21, 2013 by Sony Music Entertainment.

Additional non-original music by Norwegian music group Wardruna is featured in the episodes "Trial" and "Sacrifice". The featured tracks—which were not included in the soundtrack release—are "Fehu", "Ár var alda", "Heimta Thurs", "Dagr", "Laukr", and "Løyndomsriss".

Reception
The first season of Vikings received positive reviews. The review aggregator website Rotten Tomatoes reported an 81% approval rating with an average rating of 6.9/10 based on 27 reviews. The site's consensus reads, "Vikings makes up for its lack of historical accuracy with a heaping helping of violence, romance, and striking visuals". Metacritic assigned a score of 71 based on 20 reviews.

IGN gave the season an overall score of 7/10, stating: "While parts of the story felt rushed and sparsely told, Vikings still gave us a good first season outing."

Notes

References

External links
 
 

2013 Canadian television seasons
2013 Irish television seasons
2013 Canadian television series debuts
2013 Irish television series debuts